Yablonevy is a rural locality (a khutor) in Lysovskoye Rural Settlement, Surovikinsky District, Volgograd Oblast, Russia. The population was 78 as of 2010. There are 2 streets.

Geography 
Yablonevy is located 31 km northeast of Surovikino (the district's administrative centre) by road. Lysov is the nearest rural locality.

References 

Rural localities in Surovikinsky District